Princess Rym al-Ali (née Rym Brahimi; born 1969) is the Algerian wife of Prince Ali bin Hussein of Jordan, whom she married on 7 September 2004.

Early life 
She is the daughter of Lakhdar Brahimi, former Algerian Minister for Foreign Affairs and senior UN official, and Mila Bacic, who is of half-Croatian and half-Armenian descent. She was raised in Great Britain and Algeria, and was educated in France and the United States.

Education 
 BA in geography and an MA in English literature at the Sorbonne University in Paris - graduated with honors in 1990
 MPhil in political science at the Institut d'Études Politiques de Paris in Paris in 1991
 Master's degree at Graduate School of Journalism, concentrating on international reporting - Columbia University in 1994

Career 
Prior to marrying Prince Ali, Princess Rym worked extensively for international broadcasters including CNN, where she began as a producer in 1998 and later worked as a Baghdad correspondent from 2001 until 2004. She had developed her portfolio working for the BBC, Dubai TV, Bloomberg TV, Radio Monte-Carlo Moyen-Orient and United Press International-UPI. 

She has been the Executive Commissioner of the Royal Film Commission - Jordan since July 2005.
She is the founder of the Jordan Media Institute (JMI), a non-profit institution whose aim is to establish an Arab center of excellence for journalism education with a Master's program at its core and training-modules in parallel.
She is also the president of the Amman International Film Festival "AIFF" Awal Film since 2017.

Awards 
 In April 2011, Princess Rym Ali received a prestigious award from the Columbia University School of Journalism. The Alumni Awards are presented annually for a distinguished journalism career, an outstanding journalistic achievement, or a notable contribution to journalism education.
 In July 2011, was awarded the "Best International Journalist" prize at the 32nd Ischia International Journalism Awards Ceremony, one of the most prestigious journalistic awards in Italy.
 On 20 September 2011, Princess Rym Ali was decorated with French Knight of the Legion of Honour by French Ambassador to Jordan.
 In October 2012, she was awarded the Global Thinkers Forum 2012 Award for Excellence in Media for her exceptional work with the Jordan Media Institute (JMI).
 In November 2013, she was awarded an Honorary Doctorate of Letters by the United Kingdom's Coventry University for her contribution to the field of journalism and media, and her role in establishing the Jordan Media Institute (JMI).
 In November 2017, America Abroad Media Awarded their annual prize to Princess Rym Ali, for her significant role in media, at the 5th annual "Power of Film" Awards in Washington DC. The award honors leaders whose work exemplifies the power of media to inform, educate and empower. 
 On 5 April 2018, she was decorated as Grand Officer of the Order of Prince Henry the Navigator by The Portuguese President, Marcelo Rebelo de Sousa for her efforts in the field of culture and intercultural exchange.
 On 2 March 2020, she was decorated as Grand Cross of the Royal Norwegian Order of Merit by HM King Harald V of Norway
 On 15 November 2022, she was decorated as Member Grand Cross of the Order of the Polar Star by HM King Carl XVI Gustaf of Sweden

Personal life
She and Prince Ali live in Amman with their two children Princess Jalila bint Ali and Prince Abdullah bin Ali.

References

External links

Jordan Media Institute

Algerian emigrants to Jordan
Algerian people of Armenian descent
Algerian people of Croatian descent
1969 births
Living people
Jordanian people of Armenian descent
Jordanian people of Croatian descent
Jordanian princesses
Sciences Po alumni
Columbia University Graduate School of Journalism alumni
University of Paris alumni
Chevaliers of the Légion d'honneur
Grand Officers of the Order of Prince Henry
House of Hashim
Princesses by marriage